Kentucky Equality Federation is an umbrella organization for gay, lesbian, bisexual, and transgender civil rights in the Commonwealth of Kentucky, consisting of Federation for Kentucky Equality, Inc., Kentucky Equality Coalition, Inc., and Kentucky Equality PAC. Kentucky Equality Federation is a member of the International Lesbian, Gay, Bisexual, Trans and Intersex Association (ILGA).

Name
Originally called Kentucky Equal Rights, the organization changed its name to Kentucky Equality, with either "Association" or "Federation" always appearing afterward.  Kentucky Equality has "The Equality Party", "Commonwealth Equality", "Kentucky Equality Federation", and "Kentucky Equality Association" listed as assumed names with the Kentucky Secretary of State.

Mission
Kentucky Equality Federation believes all people are endowed with inalienable rights to life, liberty, property, and the pursuit of happiness and fulfillment free from oppression, discrimination, school bullying, and hate crimes regardless of gender identity, sexual orientation, race, creed, veteran status, political affiliation, or any other defining characteristic.  The end of discrimination is not simply the elimination of flagrant abuses, rather it is the ability of a person to fully exercise their Kentucky human rights to the same full extent enjoyed by their peers, without fear of retribution, aspersion, or harm, be that harm political or social.

Kentucky Equality Federation assists and acts as public advocate for people who have been bullied, discriminated against, or victimized in addition to assisting them with legal remedies.  When the laws have not caught up to the moral needs of society, we will seek their modification, pursuant to the creation of a just society.

Member organizations
The following organizations are listed a members of Kentucky Equality Federation:
 Marriage Equality Kentucky
 Kentucky HIV/AIDS Advocacy Campaign
 Kentucky Equal Ballot Access

Management structure
The corporations that make-up Kentucky Equality Federation are formal membership organizations. The acceptance of new members must be approved by unanimous vote of existing members ("Permanent and Official Membership"). Permanent and Official Membership have a say in the structure and priorities of the organizations. Permanent and Official Membership elect the Board of Directors and the President; they must also approve amendments to Bylaws.  Permanent and Official Membership ensure the continuation of Kentucky Equality Federation; both the Board of Directors and the President serve at the pleasure of Permanent and Official Membership. All non-board members serve at the pleasure of the president.

Committees
Public Relations Committee
Kentucky Discrimination and School Bullying Committee
Planning Committee
Transgender Special Advisory Committee 
Fundraising Committee.

Activities and history
In March 2007 the Kentucky Equality Federation won a MySpace Impact Award (since 2006) in the area of Social Justice, beating Do Something and Loose Change to Loosen Change. The Federation was awarded a $10,000.00 cash prize and promotional support from MySpace.

Boone County High School
Kentucky Equality was involved getting the first Gay-Straight Alliance approved at Boone County High School in Northern Kentucky. On July 19, 2006, Boone County High School ended more than a year of stonewalling and avoided a federal and state lawsuit by finally approving the formation of a Gay-Straight Alliance. Jordan Palmer, founder and president of the Kentucky Equality Federation, warned school officials that he would file a lawsuit in federal court for violating the federal Equal Access Act which requires schools to treat Gay-Straight Alliances as they would any other school group, and a separate lawsuit with the Kentucky Court of Justice for violating the Kentucky Education Reform Act.

Incident with Representative Fischer
Prior to the November 2006 General Election Kentucky Equality Federation President Jordan Palmer verbally attacked Kentucky Representative Joseph Fisher (R) after he stated "homosexuals have not experienced the same type of insidious discrimination in housing and employment as blacks and women."  In addition, Fischer stated he believed homosexuals could easily change their sexual orientation.

Complaint resolution and public advocate
On September 7, 2006, the Kentucky Equality Federation announced they would act as a "buffer" for victims of discrimination, hate crimes, and school bullying establishing a toll-free number, (877) KEF-5775 and an online complaint system to report incidents. The federation stated they believe a lot of incidents go unreported each year throughout Kentucky because of bad experiences in working with law enforcement, while others feared being "outed" or reprisals would ensue from their perpetrators.

Relationship with Kentucky Fairness Alliance
On January 9, 2008, Kentucky Equality Federation's General Advisory Council condemned Kentucky Fairness Alliance. According to published reports, one reason for the dispute between the two organizations was related to Bluegrass Fairness of Central Kentucky, once a chapter of Kentucky Fairness Alliance.  Kentucky Equality Federation's General Advisory Council also cited problems in working with the Executive Director of Kentucky Fairness Alliance.

The condemnation was short lived; on April 18, 2008 Kentucky Equality Federation's Board of Directors rescinded the General Advisory Council's condemnation of Kentucky Fairness Alliance and terminated 9 of the 14 members on the General Advisory Council.

University of the Cumberlands
Kentucky Equality led a protest at the Governor's Annual Derby Breakfast on May 6, 2006. The protest was in response to Governor Ernie Fletcher's refusal to veto funding to the University of the Cumberlands after expelling a student for revealing he was gay on the social networking site MySpace.

On July 7, 2009, Kentucky Equality Federation condemned the University of the Cumberlands for uninviting the Broadway Baptist Church of Texas' church choir from participating in its community based Mountain Outreach Program because of their "tolerant stance toward homosexuality." The following day Kentucky Equality Federation also condemned $1.2 million in federal funding to expand programs at the university.

Federal hate crime conviction
On March 15, 2012, the Kentucky State Police assisted the FBI in arresting David Jenkins, Anthony Jenkins, Mable Jenkins, and Alexis Jenkins of Partridge, Kentucky, for the beating of Kevin Pennington during a late-night attack in April 2011 at Kingdom Come State Park, near Cumberland. The push came from the gay-rights group Kentucky Equality Federation, whose president, Jordan Palmer, began lobbying Washington, D.C., to prosecute after stating he had no confidence in the Harlan County Commonwealth's Attorney to act. "I think the case's notoriety may have derived in large part from the Kentucky Equality Federation efforts," said Kerry Harvey, the U.S. Attorney for the Eastern District of Kentucky. Mable Jenkins and Alexis Jenkins plead guilty.

Billboard removal
On May 25, 2012, a controversial billboard condemning homosexuality and abortion was posted on New Circle Road near Leestown Road in Lexington, KY. That same billboard was later stolen, defaced, and displayed in a local Lexington eatery. The billboard owner replaced the billboard shortly thereafter. The Kentucky Equality Federation, after receiving a complaint, took action. On July 31, 2012, the billboard was confirmed as removed citing complaints launched by Jordan Palmer, President, and Brandon Combs, Chairman of the Board.

Marriage equality lawsuit

On September 10, 2013 the Kentucky Equality Federation sued the Commonwealth of Kentucky in Franklin Circuit Court claiming Kentucky's 2004 Constitutional Amendment banning same-sex marriage violated sections of the commonwealth's constitution.  Case # 13-CI-1074 was assigned by the Franklin County Court Clerk (the location of the Kentucky State Capitol). The lawsuit was conceived by President Jordan Palmer, written and signed by Vice President of Legal Jillian Hall, Esq.  Jordan Palmer stated to the media that:

Ruling
On April 16, 2015, Kentucky Equality Federation v. Beshear, also known as Kentucky Equality Federation v. Commonwealth of Kentucky, was ruled on by Franklin County Circuit Court Judge Thomas D. Wingate. Judge Wingate sided with Kentucky Equality Federation against the Commonwealth and struck down Kentucky Constitutional Amendment banning same-sex marriages. Judge Wingate also struck down all laws passed by the Kentucky General Assembly. At the request of Governor Steve Beshear's legal representation, the Judge also placed a stay on the order pending a ruling from a Kentucky appellate court (such as the Kentucky Court of Appeals or Kentucky's court of last resort, the Kentucky Supreme Court) or the U.S. Supreme Court. The lawsuit was a significant victory for the Kentucky Equality Federation and the same-sex marriage civil rights movement.

.

COVID-19 in Kentucky
Kentucky Equality Federation president Jordan Palmer criticized the Trump administration during the COVID-19 pandemic from Kentucky Equality's official Twitter as well as the Lexington Herald-Leader. Kentucky Equality Federation also retweeted multiple posts from Palmer's personal Twitter account.

See also

LGBT rights in the United States
LGBT rights in Kentucky
List of LGBT rights organizations

References
Citations

Sources

External links
 

 
 Kentucky Equality Federation Official Blog (current official blog)
 Action Center
 
 

LGBT political advocacy groups in Kentucky
Non-profit organizations based in Lexington, Kentucky
American community activists
History of LGBT civil rights in the United States
2005 establishments in Kentucky
Organizations established in 2005